Billy Mutale (born 21 June 1993) is a Zambian footballer who plays as a defender for Forest Rangers and the Zambia national football team.

References

External links

1993 births
Living people
Zambian footballers
Zambian expatriate footballers
Zambia youth international footballers
Zambia international footballers
Nchanga Rangers F.C. players
SuperSport United F.C. players
Power Dynamos F.C. players
Nkana F.C. players
South African Premier Division players
Association football defenders
Zambian expatriate sportspeople in South Africa
Expatriate soccer players in South Africa